Jesper Møller Christensen (born 9 June 1963) is a Danish sports leader, and since 1 March 2014 he has been chairman of the Danish Football Association (DBU), where he succeeded Allan Hansen.

External links 
 Jesper Møller, UEFA
 x Jesper Møller new chairman 

1963 births
Danish football chairmen and investors
Living people
20th-century Danish lawyers
21st-century Danish lawyers
Members of the UEFA Executive Committee
People from Rebild Municipality
Sportspeople from the North Jutland Region